Osterburg is a small unincorporated community in Bedford County, Pennsylvania, United States, between Bedford, Claysburg, and Imler. The ZIP Code for Osterburg is 16667. It is part of the Chestnut Ridge School District.

Economy 
Logging and dairy farming are leading parts of the economy of the Osterburg area. Local businesses include Osterburg Post Office, Slick's Ivy Stone Restaurant, First Commonwealth Bank, and Osterburg Country Store as well as Peights windows.

Education

Public schools
Osterburg is served by the Chestnut Ridge School District which operates two elementary schools, one middle school, and one high school.

Higher and post-secondary education
 Allegany College of Maryland- Bedford Campus

Recreation 
Although small, there are many recreational activities in the Osterburg area. Blue Knob State Park is also nearby and provides swimming, camping, hunting, fishing, hiking, snowmobiling, cross country skiing and downhill skiing.

Transportation 
Osterburg is a half mile from access to I-99 and US 220, with easy access to Altoona, Bellefonte, Bedford, and the Pennsylvania Turnpike.

References 

Unincorporated communities in Bedford County, Pennsylvania
Unincorporated communities in Pennsylvania